Bukit Pasoh Road (Chinese: 武吉巴梳路) is a road in Tanjong Pagar within the Outram Planning Area of Singapore. The road starts from Neil Road which is one way, but becomes two ways, when the road forks out into two parts, with one  becoming Teo Hong Road, with both roads ending at New Bridge Road. The road is mainly lined with conserved shophouses and houses a high-end boutique hotel known as the New Majestic Hotel.

Etymology and history
Before Bukit Pasoh was named, there used to be many kilns on the hill which produced pots, bricks and tiles, inclusive of pasohs (meaning flower pot in Malaya, also known as Ali Baba jars or tongs) which were used to store rice or water.

Bukit Pasoh was initially named Dickenson's Hill after Rev J.T. Dickenson, followed by Bukit Padre and finally Bukit Pasoh. The road was located on the hill and named after the road

Conservation 
The road and its vicinity is a conservation area known as Bukit Pasoh Conservation Area, which is bounded by New Bridge Road, Keong Saik Road, Kreta Ayer Road, Neil Road and Cantonment Road. This area was given the conservation area status on 7 July 1989. The shophouses mainly consist of two and three storey shophouses in transitional, late and art deco styles.

References

Roads in Singapore
Protected areas of Singapore
Outram, Singapore
Tanjong Pagar